The eagle owl is a bird species.

Eagle Owl may also refer to:

Heinkel He 219 Uhu (Eagle Owl), a German World War II night fighter
Focke-Wulf Fw 189 Uhu, a German World War II reconnaissance aircraft
Eagle Owls, nickname of No. 307 Polish Night Fighter Squadron, which fought alongside the Royal Air Force during World War II